The National Philatelic Museum (NPM) at Dak Bhawan, New Delhi, India, is operated by the Department of Post. The facility. which is housed on the ground floor of a building, underwent a redevelopment in 2011. It now hosts an amphitheater for presentations and discussions, a library and an area where artists can be seen at work, as well as displays of postage stamps and related items. The Museum has displayed number of frames in which exhibits of Post Independence era stamps can impress any Visitor with its charm. The frames have been arranged beautifully in different sections like section for Sheetlets, section for different themes, Section for Stamps from different countries.

The museum organises philatelic workshops on regular basis with the students of different schools. Children discover many stories that stamps can tell and appreciate how these colorful and attractive stamps are educational yet fun for them.
The museum also has a souvenir shop which offers variety of philatelic products like stamps, year packs, stamp albums, picture postcards, pictorial cancellation of National Philatelic Museum, and gift items.

History
The museum was designed by Dr. Anand Burdhan of the Delhi Institute of Heritage Research & Management, who is also secretary of the Museum Association of India.

It is situated on Sansad Marg (Parliament Street) near Connaught Place, New Delhi, and is opened from 10:00AM to 05:00PM all days in a week for the visitors without any fee. The Museum also figures on the list of HOHO Bus as one of the prominent stops.

See also 
 List of philatelic museums

References 

Museums in Delhi
Philatelic museums

Philately of India
Year of establishment missing